Jithender Yadagiri  was born on 25 May 1970 at Bhadrachalam, Telangana. He is a Film Director in the Telugu film industry Tollywood. He has worked as co director in numerous T.V. Soaps and Films, predominantly in the Telugu Language.

As co-director
As a Co-Director, he worked for the following Films/TV Soaps/ Documentaries 
 Annamacharya Keerthanalu (D.D. Daily Soap)
 Sandhya Ragam (Tele Film)
 Sathyapeetham (political documentary)
 Jai Veera Hanuman (Padmalaya Studios mega Serial)
 Amayaka Chakravarthy (Folk Serial)
 Maya kankanam (Serial in Gemini Television)
 Nomulu Vratalu (Serial in Gemini Television)
 Mana Mahaneeyulu (Historical Serial)
 Sundari Neevekkada (Daily soap)
 Rangula Kalalu (Gemini TV Comedy Serial)
 Ayyappa Mahimalu (Gemini TV Serial)
 Bhakta Ramadasu (Historical Serial in Gemini TV)
 Shanti nivasam (ETV Mega Serial)
 Puttinti Gowravam (Feature Film)
 Rendu kutumabala katha (Feature Film)
 Toka leni pitta (feature Film)

As a Director

 An Anti arrack Documentary with Doobagunta Rosamma
 Udyamam a tele film telecast in Doordarshan
 A film based Prema Enta Madhuram & Galivarthalu serials for city cable produced by Sri H.M.Reddy
 Election Ads for B.J.P such as Samardhulu, Okka Votu, Vajpayee personality
 Profit shoe company Ad
 Tennety Bros Aagarabathi Ad
 A 13 episodes Sunday Morning Show “Sankellu” telecast in Gemini TV
 More than 60 episodes of super hit mega serial Santhinivasam which was produced by Sri K.Raghavendra Rao
 Feature Film “Chakri”  starring Vadde Naveen, Poonam Senegar which was shot in United Kingdom released in 2006 November
 Feature Film “Veduka”  starring eminent Director "K. Viswanath", “Anand” Raja and Poonam Bajwa released on 31 May 2007.
 Feature Film Yamaho Yama starring “Sai Ram Shankar”, “Sri Hari”, “Parvathi Melton”, “Sanjana”, “M.S Narayana” released on 14th Dec 2012. 
“Nirahua the Leader” Feature film in Bhojpuri Language, starring Dinesh Lal Yaad, Amrapali and others.
 Jhatka Jaroori Hai - Hindi Comedy movie released in Hungama OTT Platform.
 Shankhnaad Bhojpuri Movie - released in Zee Bioscope on 13th November 2022.
 On going Bhojpuri project - ATOOT RISTHA, Starring Pramod Premi, Sudhiksha jha.

As a Film Distributor

 A Feature Film Amaravathi produced by Anand Prasad, Directed by Allari Ravibabu
 A Feature Film Mahatma produced by Manohar, Directed by Krishna Vamsy
 A Feature Film High School produced by Mallanna, Directed by Narasimha Nandi.

As a Producer

 Produced Telugu comedy Movie “Comedy Express”, released on 30 July 2010.
 Hindi Movie “Jhatka Jaroori Hai” streaming now on Hungama play.

Early life
He was born to Late Mr. Y. Srinivasa Murthy and Mrs Y. Lakshmi Kumari. His father wanted him to have a proper education and a good job and thus he completed his Diploma in civil Engineering. However, since the first time his father brought home a television he has been attracted towards the creative work in daily soaps and films and so even after being well educated he couldn't pursue a job and come into the film industry at an early age. His aim in life is to be an excellent creative director.

As a child Jithender's inspiration for his foray into films was his father. His father was a stage artist and had a drama company called Karmika Kala Bharathi. They would perform stage plays and there Jithender would pull the curtains initially. Then he became a prompter. Later on he became a stage artist himself and started to do good roles in the stage plays. As a stage actor he acquired a good following so much so that he was looked upon like a celebrity in his own village. Then on he went on to clear the All India Radio auditions as a vocalist and an actor and then became a part of Akash Vaani. From there, he went on to perform a mono play called Kanyadaatha in Doordarshan and thus he also became a part of Doordarshan. So, early in his life he took inspiration from his father and came into this field of Indian Cinema.

Awards
Swarna Bharati Foundation: First Telugu director to direct a film in Universal Studios Hollywood-2016, june14th
Chief Ministers Award:  As a Script Writer for M.L.A's cultural meet held in 1987

References

1969 births
Living people